Steven De Petter (born 22 November 1985) is a retired Belgian football player. He was born in Aalst, Belgium.

De Petter retired in the summer 2020.

References

External links
 

1985 births
Living people
Sportspeople from Aalst, Belgium
Footballers from East Flanders
Belgian footballers
F.C.V. Dender E.H. players
K.V.C. Westerlo players
K.V. Mechelen players
Sint-Truidense V.V. players
Challenger Pro League players
Belgian Pro League players
Association football midfielders